Carleton Lewis Brownson (January 19, 1866 - September 27, 1948) was a professor of the Greek language and Latin language and dean of the College of Liberal Arts at City College of New York.

Biography
He was born on January 19, 1866, in Connecticut and he received an A.B. from Yale University in 1887. He traveled to Athens, Greece and became a student member at the American School of Classical Studies at Athens from 1890 to 1892. In 1897 he received his Ph.D. from Yale University, and was offered a teaching position at City College of New York. By 1909 he was dean of the College of Liberal Arts at City College of New York till 1926 when he was promoted to Dean of the Faculty. He died in 1948 in New York City.

References

City College of New York faculty
American School of Classical Studies at Athens
1866 births
1948 deaths